Lloyd Gifford Gronsdahl (May 10, 1921 in Norquay, Saskatchewan — December 15, 1989) was a professional ice hockey player who played ten games in the National Hockey League with the Boston Bruins during the 1941–42 season. The rest of his career, which lasted from 1941 to 1951, was spent in various minor leagues.

Gronsdahl scored one NHL goal. It came on March 3, 1942 in Boston's 5-3 win over Toronto at Boston Garden.

Career statistics

Regular season and playoffs

External links
 

1921 births
1989 deaths
Boston Bruins players
Boston Olympics players
Canadian ice hockey right wingers
Hershey Bears players
Ice hockey people from Saskatchewan
Tulsa Oilers (USHL) players
Ontario Hockey Association Senior A League (1890–1979) players